Events from the year 1804 in Germany.

Incumbents

Holy Roman Empire 
 Francis II (5 July 17926 August 1806)

Important Electors
 Baden- Charles Frederick (27 April 18036 August 1806)
 Bavaria- Maximilian I (16 February 17996 August 1806)
 Saxony- Frederick Augustus I (17 December 176320 December 1806)
 Württemberg - Frederick I (180330 October 1816)

Kingdoms 
 Kingdom of Prussia
 Monarch – Frederick William III of Prussia (16 November 17977 June 1840)

Grand Duchies 
 Grand Duke of Mecklenburg-Schwerin
 Frederick Francis I (24 April 17851 February 1837)
 Grand Duke of Mecklenburg-Strelitz
 Charles II (2 June 17946 November 1816)
 Grand Duke of Oldenburg
 Wilhelm (6 July 17852 July 1823) Due to mental illness, Wilhelm was duke in name only, with his cousin Peter, Prince-Bishop of Lübeck, acting as regent throughout his entire reign.
 Peter I (2 July 182321 May 1829)
 Grand Duke of Saxe-Weimar
 Karl August  (1758–1809) Raised to grand duchy in 1809

Principalities 
 Schaumburg-Lippe
 George William (13 February 17871860)
 Schwarzburg-Rudolstadt
 Louis Frederick II (13 April 179328 April 1807)
 Schwarzburg-Sondershausen
 Günther Friedrich Karl I (14 October 179419 August 1835)
 Principality of Lippe
 Leopold II (5 November 18021 January 1851)
 Principality of Reuss-Greiz
 Heinrich XIII (28 June 180029 January 1817)
 Waldeck and Pyrmont
 Friedrich Karl August  (29 August 176324 September 1812)

Duchies 
 Duke of Anhalt-Dessau
 Leopold III (16 December 17519 August 1817)
 Duke of Saxe-Altenburg
 Duke of Saxe-Hildburghausen (1780–1826)  - Frederick
 Duke of Saxe-Coburg-Saalfeld
 Francis (8 September 18009 December 1806)
 Duke of Saxe-Meiningen
 Bernhard II (24 December 180320 September 1866)
 Duke of Schleswig-Holstein-Sonderburg-Beck
 Frederick Charles Louis (24 February 177525 March 1816)

Other
 Landgrave of Hesse-Darmstadt
 Louis I (6 April 179014 August 1806)

Events 
 17 March – Friedrich Schiller's play Wilhelm Tell, is first performed at Weimar, under the direction of Johann Wolfgang von Goethe.
 9 June – Beethoven's Symphony No. 3 in E–flat premiered in Vienna.
 11 August – In reaction to Napoleon being proclaimed emperor of France, Francis II assumes the title of a hereditary emperor of Austria (as Francis I) in addition to his title as emperor of the Holy Roman Empire. Tis latter title will become obsolete two years later when the formation of the Confederation of the Rhine instigated by Napoleon signals the end of the Holy Roman Empire.
 1 September – German astronomer K. L. Harding discovers the asteroid Juno.
 German pharmacist Friedrich Sertürner first isolates morphine from opium, probably the first ever isolation of a natural plant alkaloid.
 German Gerhard Bonnier begins a publishing business in Copenhagen (Denmark) by issuing , origin of the Swedish Bonnier Group.

Births 

 12 February – Heinrich Lenz, Russian-born Baltic German physicist (died 1865)
 5 April – Matthias Schleiden, German botanist (died 1881)
 5 June – Robert Schomburgk, German-born explorer (died 1865)
 28 July – Ludwig Feuerbach, German philosopher (died 1872)
 8 September – Eduard Mörike, German poet (died 1875)
 24 October – Wilhelm Eduard Weber, German physicist  (died 1891)
 10 December – Carl Gustav Jacob Jacobi, German mathematician (died 1851)

Deaths 

 12 February – Immanuel Kant, German philosopher (born 1724)
 25 May – Johann Joachim Spalding, German theologian (born 1714)
 1 November – Johann Friedrich Gmelin, German naturalist (born 1748)
 5 November – August Friedrich Oelenhainz, German painter (born 1745) 
 9 December – Wilhelm Abraham Teller, German theologian (born 1734)
 unknown date – Peter Haas, German-Danish engraver (born 1754)

References 

Years of the 19th century in Germany
 
Germany
Germany